Mylae or Mylai, also called Mylas (Μύλας) or Myle, was a town of ancient Cilicia, located on a promontory of the same name, between Aphrodisias and Cape Sarpedon (modern Incekum Burnu).

Its site is located near Manastır in Asiatic Turkey.

References

Populated places in ancient Cilicia
Former populated places in Turkey
History of Mersin Province